Horton is a former civil parish, now in the parish of Blyth, in Northumberland, England, about  west of Blyth, and south of the River Blyth. Historically a chapelry of Woodhorn, it became part of Blyth Urban District in 1912, and in 1920 it was abolished, when it was combined with Bebside, Cowpen, and Newsham and South Blyth to form a single parish for the district. In 1911 the parish had a population of 2546.

The place-name Horton is a common one in England. It derives from Old English horu ("dirt") and tūn ("settlement, farm, estate"), presumably meaning "farm on muddy soil".

Religious sites 
The church is dedicated to St Mary the Virgin.

References

Former civil parishes in Northumberland
Blyth, Northumberland